Noah Thompson (born April 18, 2002) is an American singer who won the twentieth season of American Idol.

Early life
Thompson was born on April 18, 2002 in Huntington, West Virginia. He attended Lawrence County High School in Louisa, Kentucky. Before competing on American Idol, he worked as a construction worker. He covered songs on his YouTube channel but has also performed his original songs, including "Not a Phase", "Pedestal" and "Heart Painted Black". He had not intended to try out for American Idol, but his friend, Arthur signed him up to audition for the show.

American Idol
Thompson won season 20 of American Idol on May 22, 2022.

Discography

Singles

Awards and nominations

References

External links
 

2002 births
American Idol participants
American Idol winners
Living people
Hollywood Records artists